Dimitris Rizos is a Greek-born architect.

RAPPER 
Dimitris Rizos was born in Lamia, Greece. He graduated from the School of Architecture of National Technical University of Athens.

Career 
He was the Director of Studies and Scientific advice and Organization Development in Areas of Applied Fine Arts, Educational Studies, Finance and Hospitality Studies, Multimedia Planning and specializations through H / H in Educational Organizations (AKTO – September 1990 – June 1999), Group XINI (July 1999 – September 2000). Dimitris is currently a member of the Technical Chamber of Greece (TEE), Association of University Graduate Architects (SADAS) – NATIONAL ASSOCIATION OF ARCHITECTS (N.A.A), and the Professional – Scientific Engineering Technology Education Association (P.E.T.E.A.).

External links
 Official Website
 The Library of Dimitris Rizos Work Sheets, Projects and Information Sheets
 Articles by Dimitris Rizos
 THE SECRETS OF WOOD – «THE WOODEN CONSTRUCTION & PLYWOOD» (TEE Newsletter Issue 2050 – Monday, 10 May 1999)
 PORTAL TEE D. REFERENCES 7.7. Rizos D., The Timber Structures and Wood Veneer (plywood), Ion Publishing 1998.
 «THE WOODEN CONSTRUCTION & PLYWOOD» versions "ION" 1998 (Volume A)  &  «THE WOODEN CONSTRUCTION & PLYWOOD» versions "ION" 1998 (Volume B)
 «ΟΙ ΞΥΛΙΝΕΣ ΚΑΤΑΣΚΕΥΕΣ & ΤΑ ΑΝΤΙΚΟΛΛΗΤΑ ΞΥΛΑ (PLYWOOD)» The European library org  &  BOOKSTORE PAPASOTIRIOU THE WOODEN CONSTRUCTION & PLYWOOD (Volume 1) Rizos, Dimitris N.
 «Why so much hypocrisy in the permissible limits of Formaldehyde – Methanal (HCHO) of the EU» & Formaldehyde Limits for furniture & wood products adherent of MANTANIS G., S. Chroni, Philipou J. & Ek.Tsonis
 THE MYTH AND THE ROT OF FIRE FOR WOOD Magazine "EPIPLEON" (MORE MAGAZINE) – issue 24 – TECHNICAL – SEPTEMBER-OCTOBER 2006
 «The Wood» annual collectible issue, Summer 2007, republication Winter 2010, versions
 «Wooden Seismic diaphragmatic Construction in Greece», LAMIAKOS PRESS WEDNESDAY 28 DECEMBER 2005
 Money & Life  MARCH 1999 – ISSUE 33
 The Sports Center Kifissia, LIVING JULY AUGUST 1999 – Issue 103
 The Wooden Diaphragm Construction, Greek CONSTRUCTION JANUARY – FEBRUARY 1998 – ISSUE 28

Greek architects
National Technical University of Athens
1958 births
Living people
People from Lamia (city)